Jeu de paume (originally spelled), nowadays known as real tennis, (US) court tennis or (in France) courte paume, is a ball-and-court game that originated in France. It was an indoor precursor of tennis played without racquets, and so "game of the hand", though these were eventually introduced. It is a former Olympic sport, and has the oldest ongoing annual world championship in sport, first established over 250 years ago. The term also refers to the court on which the game is played and its building, which in the 17th century was sometimes converted into a theatre.

History

In the earliest versions of the game, the players hit the ball with their hands, as in palla, volleyball, or certain varieties of pelota. Jeu de paume, or jeu de paulme as it was formerly spelled, literally means "palm game".  In time, gloves replaced bare hands.  Even when paddle-like bats, and finally racquets, became standard equipment for the game by the late 17th century, the name did not change.  It became known as "tennis" in English (see History of tennis), and later "real tennis" after the derived game of lawn tennis became the more widely known sport.

The term is used in France today to denote the game of tennis on a court in which the ancient or modern game might be played. The indoor version is sometimes called jeu de courte paume or just courte paume ("short palm") to distinguish it from the outdoor version, longue paume ("long palm"), played on a field of variable length.

Jeu de paume at the 1908 Summer Olympics was a medal event; American Jay Gould II won the gold medal.

Since 1740, jeu de paume has been the subject of an amateur world championship, held each year in September. It is the oldest active trophy in international sport.

Derived sports

Hand
 Fistball
 Fives
 Frisian handball
 Pallone
 Basque pelota
 Gaelic handball

Various other forms of handball may be related to one degree or another; this is generally difficult to ascertain with certainty, and some, like the Mesoamerican ballgame clearly have an independent origin.

Racquet
 Real tennis
 Longue paume (outdoor version of jeu de paume without net)
 Lawn tennis (what is usually meant by the term "tennis" today)
Various other racquet games (squash, badminton, etc.) may be related to one degree or another.

Basket

Cultural references

Étienne Pasquier, a writer and an historian, published an essay regarding jeu de paume in his Recherches; late 16th century.  Pasquier was addicted to the sport.

The Galerie nationale du Jeu de Paume, a museum of contemporary art, is housed in a former court on the north side of the Tuileries park in the centre of Paris.

The painter Jacques-Louis David's famous sketch, le Serment du jeu de paume ('the Tennis Court Oath') now hangs in the court of the Palace of Versailles. It depicts a seminal moment of the French Revolution, when, on 20 June 1789, deputies of the Estates-General met at the court and vowed that they would not disband before the proclamation of a formal Constitution for France.

Le Jeu de Paume is a moral ode published in 1791 by André Chénier.

In the 1981 film The French Lieutenant's Woman, socialite Charles Smithson (Jeremy Irons) is seen playing jeu de paume in London.

The 2014 Whitney Biennial exhibition featured the premiere of the stop-motion film Jeu de Paume by Joshua Mosley.

See also
 Basque pelota
 Valencian pilota

References

External links

 Historical Picture: A Jeu de Paume Before a Country Palace
 Oratory Real Tennis Club
 Jeu de Paume History
  Official site of the French Jeu de Paume Comité
 Animated stop motion film of Jeu de Paume match

 

Ball games
Forms of tennis
Former Summer Olympic sports
Sports originating in France